Jean Marie Privat Befolo Mbarga (born 7 January 1992), commonly known as Privat Mbarga, is a Cameroonian professional footballer who plays as a winger for Indonesian Liga 1 club Bali United.

Club career

Bali United
In December 2021, Mbarga joined Bali United from Cambodian side Svay Rieng. Mbarga scored in his debut for Bali United in 2021–22 Liga 1 tie against Barito Putera as his team won 3–0.

Honours

Clubs
Svay Rieng
 C-League: 2019

Bali United
 Liga 1: 2021–22

Individual
2020 C-League Golden Boot
2019 C-League Golden Boot
2019 C-League Most Valuable Player
 APPI Indonesian Football Award Best 11: 2021–22 '''

References

External links

1992 births
Living people
Association football midfielders
Footballers from Douala
Cameroonian footballers
Cambodian Premier League players
Angkor Tiger FC players
Nagaworld FC players
Preah Khan Reach Svay Rieng FC players
Liga 1 (Indonesia) players
Bali United F.C. players
Cameroonian expatriate footballers
Expatriate footballers in Cambodia
Expatriate footballers in Thailand
Cameroonian expatriate sportspeople in Thailand
Cameroonian expatriate sportspeople in Cambodia
Expatriate footballers in Indonesia
Cameroonian expatriate sportspeople in Indonesia